List of Japanese games may refer to:

 List of traditional Japanese games
 List of Japanese board games

See also
:Category:Video games developed in Japan

Japanese games